Flaxwood is a Finnish manufacturer of guitars and instrument parts based in North Karelia. The company produces instruments from a natural fibre-reinforced thermoplastic through a patented injection moulding process. Flaxwood was founded in 2005 following a research project on natural fibre-reinforced thermoplastic composites led by Heikki Koivurova. A prototype was developed initially in 2003 with the design input of Luthier Veijo Rautia and two years later Flaxwood introduced their first line of guitars. In 2011, they released a line of hybrid guitars.

Design

Material
The body, neck and backplate of a Flaxwood guitar are made of a fibre-reinforced thermoplastic composite. The composite material, also known as Kareline FLX, was developed through a collaboration between Heikki Koivurova, an industrial designer from Joensuu, Kareline, a Finnish manufacturer of composite materials, and the then University of Joensuu. It consists of small wood fibres, in this case from recycled northern spruce, mixed with a thermoplastic bonding agent. The semi-liquid mixture is moulded into shape with the fibres set in a predetermined direction. This results in a uniform material with a density of 1 or 2 kg/cm³ (74906 lb/ft³) that can be recycled. It is also impervious to humidity and temperature variations.

Manufacturing
Flaxwood produces and assembles their instruments and parts in Joensuu, Finland. The parts that come out of the mould are shaped with the cavities, pockets, joints and practically all the holes. They are then assembled and finished by hand with tools that are commonly used in traditional guitar workshops.

Products

Guitars

Flaxwood Series
The guitar models of the regular line come with approximately similar features and various pick-up configurations. The bodies are semi-hollow with a backplate and come with either a Gotoh 510UB hardtail bridge, a Gotoh GE-103B tune-o-matic bridge or a Schaller LP tremolo bridge. The glued in necks feature 22 medium jumbo frets, a 25.5" scale length and a 1-11/16" Tune-X Tuning System nut. Almost each Flaxwood guitar bears a Finnish name representing its main personality and characteristics.

Instrument Components
Since 2011, Flaxwood has launched a line of components for music instruments such as bolt-on guitar necks, guitar blanks and fingerboard blanks for bowed string instruments. Some of the components are used by other companies like the German violin manufacturer Mezzo-Forte.

Notable players
 Les Dudek
 Bugs Henderson
 Phil Palmer
 Dean Parks
 Axel Ritt
 Waddy Wachtel
 Dave Young

References

External links
 Official website

Guitar manufacturing companies
Manufacturing companies of Finland
Finnish companies established in 2005
Manufacturing companies established in 2005